Siu Hong may refer to:

Places 

 Siu Hong Court, a public housing estate in Tuen Mun, Hong Kong
 Siu Hong station, an MTR rapid transit station adjacent to the estate
 Siu Hong stop, an MTR Light Rail stop adjacent to the estate

People 

 Wu Siu Hong (born 1984), ten-pin bowling player from Hong Kong